Larry Davidson (born August 21, 1955) is an American former professional tennis player.

Davidson grew up in New Rochelle, New York and during the 1970s played collegiate tennis at Pennsylvania's Swarthmore College. He won an NCAA Division III doubles championship in 1976 (with John Irwin) and was the Middle Atlantic Conferences singles champion in 1977. After graduating he competed on the professional tour and made a main draw appearance at the 1980 US Open, where he lost in the first round to 16th seed Victor Amaya.

References

External links
 
 

1955 births
Living people
American male tennis players
Tennis people from New York (state)
College men's tennis players in the United States
Swarthmore College alumni
Sportspeople from New Rochelle, New York